Jang Chan-jae (born January 6, 1989) is a South Korean former professional cyclist.

Major results

2010
 1st Stage 2 Tour of Seoul
2011
 1st Overall Jeolginyeon Stage Race
1st Stage 2
 1st Stage 2 Tour de Korea
 1st Stage 7b Tour de Singkarak
2012
 1st  Road race, National Road Championships
 1st Stage 3 Tour de Korea
 9th Road race, Asian Road Championships
2013
 3rd Road race, National Road Championships
2014
 3rd Road race, National Road Championships
 10th Melaka Governor's Cup

References

External links

1989 births
Living people
South Korean male cyclists
Universiade medalists in cycling
Universiade bronze medalists for South Korea
Medalists at the 2011 Summer Universiade
20th-century South Korean people
21st-century South Korean people